Nickelodeon Splat! was a television block consisting of game show interstitials on Nickelodeon. It aired live from March 7, 2004 to August 17, 2004. A webpage created for the game allowed viewers to interact with the program while it was airing. It was the last show taped at Nickelodeon Studios at Universal Studios Florida in Orlando, Florida alongside another Nickelodeon show, Gamefarm, prior to its closure on April 30, 2005.

Gameplay
The game-based interstitials follow teams divided into three colors (green, yellow and red). The teams, composed of audience members and selected guests from the Universal Studios Florida theme park, must complete humorous tasks to earn prizes. The winning team is slimed at the end of the game.

Splish Splat!

In 2004, Jakks Pacific created a gel-based compound based on the slime used in the program. The toy was sold under the name Splish Splat! in 2005.

References

s
s
2000s American game shows
Interactive television
2004 American television series debuts
2004 American television series endings